With Byrd at the South Pole (1930) is a documentary film about Rear Admiral Richard E. Byrd and his 1st quest to the South Pole beginning at the Little America-Exploration Base. The film's soundtrack consists mostly of music and sound effects, with narration read by Floyd Gibbons. The film won at the 3rd Academy Awards for Best Cinematography.

The film was the first documentary to win any Oscar and the only one to win cinematography.

Cast
Richard E. Byrd...Himself (Expedition Commander) (as Rear Admiral Richard E. Byrd)
Claire Alexander...Supply Officer
Bernt Balchen...Aviation Pilot
George H. Black...Seaman and Tractor Man 
Quin A. Blackburn...Topographer 
Kennard F. Bubier...Aviation Mechanic
Christopher Braathen...Seaman, Ski Man 
Jacob Bursey...Seaman, Dog Driver 
Arnold H. Clark...Fireman 
Francis D. Coman...Medical Officer (as Dr. Francis D. Coman) 
Frederick E. Crockett...Dog Driver
Victor H. Czegka...Machinist
Frank T. Davies...Physicist
Joe de Ganahl...Mate
E.J. Demas...Aviation Mechanic
James A. Feury...Fireman
Edward E. Goodale...Dog Driver
Charles F. Gould...Carpenter
Lawrence M. Gould...Geologist and Geographer/2nd Comm. (as Dr. Lawrence M. Gould)
William C. Haines...Meteorologist
Malcolm P. Hanson...Radio Operator 
Henry R. Harrison Jr.Aerologist 
Harold June...Aviation Pilot 
Charles E. Lofgren...  Personnel Officer 
Howard F. Mason...Radio Operator 
Ashley C. McKinley...Aerial Photographer (as Captain Ashley C. McKinley) 
Thomas B. Mulroy...Chief Engineer 
John S. O'Brien...Surveyor
Russell Owen...Newspaper Correspondent 
Alton U. Parker...Aviation Pilot (as Captain Alton U. Parker) 
Carl O. Petersen...Radio Operator 
Martin Rønne...Sailmaker 
Benjamin Roth...Aviation Mechanic 
Paul A. Siple...Boy Scout 
Dean Smith...Aviation Pilot 
Sverre Strom...Second Officer 
George W. Tennant...Cook
George A. Thorne Jr.Seaman, Ski Man, Surveyor 
Norman D. Vaughan...Dog Driver
Arthur Treadwell Walden...In Charge of Dogs
Floyd Gibbons...Narrator

DVD release

With Byrd at the South Pole was released on DVD in February 2000. It is part of a Milestone collection that is very limited.

See also
The Lost Zeppelin (1929)

References

External links 
 
 
 With Byrd At The South Pole Movie Scrapbook at Dartmouth College Library

1930 documentary films
1930 films
Black-and-white documentary films
American documentary films
Documentary films about Antarctica
Documentary films about aviation
American aviation films
Documentary films about historical events
Paramount Pictures films
Films whose cinematographer won the Best Cinematography Academy Award
American black-and-white films
1930s English-language films
1930s American films